Tyrone Walls (born December 31, 1947) is a retired Canadian football player who played for the Edmonton Eskimos and BC Lions. Walls played college football at the University of Missouri and was drafted by the Buffalo Bills in the eighth round of the 1971 NFL Draft, but played his entire professional career in the CFL.

References

1947 births
Living people
Edmonton Elks players